The 1995 Asian Basketball Confederation Championship for Women, was the 16th regional championship held by Asian Basketball Confederation. The competition was hosted by Shizuoka, Japan and took place between July 23 to July 30, 1995. The championship is divided into two levels: Level I and Level II. The last finisher of Level I is relegated to Level II and the top finisher of Level II qualify for Level I 1997's championship.

Preliminary round

Level I

Level II

Final round

3rd place

Final

Final standing

Awards

References

 Results
 archive.fiba.com

1995
1995 in women's basketball
women
B
Bask